William Vaness McGill (November 10, 1873 – August 29, 1944) was an American major league baseball pitcher. He played professionally for the Cleveland Infants, Cincinnati Kelly's Killers, St. Louis Browns, Cincinnati Reds, Chicago Colts, St. Louis Browns and the Philadelphia Phillies.

Biography
McGill was born in Atlanta and attended the University of Notre Dame. He played his first professional game with the Cleveland Infants on May 8, 1890.

He pitched for seven years, with six different teams. His best year was with the 1891 St. Louis Browns when he had a 19–10 record with a 2.93 ERA. He finished his career with a 4.59 earned run average. He played his last game on June 12, 1896.

McGill died on August 29, 1944 in Indianapolis, and is interred at Crown Hill Cemetery in Indianapolis.

References

External links

 Baseball Almanac
 ESPN MLB

1873 births
1944 deaths
Burials at Crown Hill Cemetery
19th-century baseball players
Major League Baseball pitchers
Cleveland Infants players
Cincinnati Kelly's Killers players
St. Louis Browns (AA) players
Cincinnati Reds players
Chicago Colts players
Philadelphia Phillies players
Butler Bulldogs baseball coaches
Northwestern Wildcats baseball coaches
Baseball players from Atlanta
Evansville Hoosiers players
Burlington Babies players
Menominee (minor league baseball) players
St. Paul Apostles players
St. Paul Saints (Western League) players
Columbus Buckeyes (minor league) players
Columbus Senators players
Grand Rapids Furnituremakers players
Chicago White Stockings (minor league) players
Peoria Distillers players
Evansville River Rats players
Milwaukee Brewers (minor league) players
Toledo Mud Hens players
Norwich Reds players
Indianapolis Indians players
Freeport Pretzels players